Mette Jæger Blomsterberg (born 20 July 1970) is a Danish pastry chef,  restaurateur and cookbook writer. She has been a judge in the television programme Den store bagedyst, the Danish equivalent of The Great British Bake Off.

Biography
Born in Helsingør in 1970, Blomsterberg was trained as a pastry cook at Kransekagehuset, a Copenhagen bakery. She is married to Henrik Jæger whom she met in Helsingør in 1992. They have two children. Henrik, who has changed his name to Blomsterberg, works with his wife in the café they established in Lyngby in 2014. Mette Blomsterberg had previously worked as a pastry chef at the Ny Carlsberg Glyptotek (1995–2011) before opening a café in Copenhagen in 2011.

Publications
Mette Blomsterberg has published the following cookbooks, all in Danish:

References

External links
Mette Blomsterberg's website (in Danish)

1970 births
Danish restaurateurs
Danish bakers
Danish television personalities
Danish women writers
Danish cookbook writers
Women cookbook writers
Women restaurateurs
Pastry chefs
People from Helsingør
Living people